The Kenora City Council is the governing body for the city of Kenora, Ontario, Canada. The council consists of the mayor and six councillors.

Current Kenora City Council 
Dave Canfield, mayor
Dan Reynard, councillor
Mort Goss, councillor
Rory McMillan, councillor
Sharon Smith, councillor
Colin Wasacase, councillor
Louis Roussin, councillor

References

External links 
Kenora City Council website

Municipal councils in Ontario
Politics of Kenora